The following is a list of works by Jean Sibelius (18651957), presented as a sortable table with eight parameters: title, category, key, catalogue number, year of composition, genre, and—if applicable—text author; for some compositions, comments are provided, as well. The table's default ordering is by genre and, within a genre, by date.

Oeuvre 
The compositional career of the Finnish composer Jean Sibelius extended over eight decades, from juvenilia and unpublished works written in the 1870s and 1880s to his final works of the 1940s; the 1890s–1920s, however, represent the key years of his activity. Sibelius composed across many genres, and his oeuvre includes large-scale orchestral compositions, chamber music, songs, piano pieces, and choral works.

Most highly regarded as a composer for the orchestra, the core of Sibelius's oeuvre is his set of seven symphonies, the last of which (in one movement) erodes the traditional subdivisions of sonata form. (An eighth symphony likely was destroyed by the composer in the late 1930s.) In addition, the choral work Kullervo and the orchestral suite Lemminkäinen—both based upon Kalevala myths—are classified occasionally as unnumbered, programmatic symphonies.

In addition, Sibelius was a significant contributor to the symphonic poem repertoire. His 16 examples in the form (with Lemminkäinen disaggregated) span the duration of his career and include not only two of his most popular works, The Swan of Tuonela and Finlandia, but also some of his most critically acclaimed: En saga, Pohjola's Daughter, Luonnotar, The Oceanides, and Tapiola. Sibelius also frequently composed for the stage, and his scores for Nordic productions of Shakespeare's The Tempest and Maeterlinck's Pelléas and Mélisande are particularly admired. (He famously abandoned his operatic ambitions in the 1890s.)

Within the concertante and chamber genres, the Violin Concerto and the string quartet Voces intimae (each in D minor), respectively, ensure Sibelius's reputation.

Catalogues 

Beginning in 1896, Sibelius began to keep a personal catalogue of his works. Throughout his career, he continually curated the collection according to his ever-changing assessment of his own oeuvre, promoting works to or demoting them from the catalogue and filling the resulting availabilities without a strict regard for compositional chronology. The final list of opus numbers, therefore, is an imperfect indicator of his stylistic maturation over time. For works without opus numbers, the convention is to follow the supplemental JS numbering system of Fabian Dahlström. A handful of compositions, which primarily date from Sibelius's student years, are without either catalogue designation; they are thus reserved for a supplementary list that follows the sortable table.

List of compositions 

{| class="wikitable sortable plainrowheaders" style="margin-right: 0; font-size: 95%"
|-
|+ Compositions by Jean Sibelius
|-
! scope="col" style="width:22%;"| Title
! scope="col" | Category
! scope="col" | Key
! scope="col" data-sort-type="number"| Op.
! scope="col" data-sort-type="number"| JS
! scope="col" | Year
! scope="col" | Genre
! scope="col" | Text
! scope="col" class="unsortable" | Comments

{{Classical composition row
| title = Come Away, Death
| subtitle =
| key = 
| details = Voice
| scoring = 
| catalogue =  
| year = 
| genre = Song
| description = Voice, pf (guitar)
| text = 
| reference = First of the Two Songs from 'Twelfth Night'''; later arranged by the composer for voice and orchestra
}}

{{Classical composition row
| title = Hey, ho, the Wind and the Rain| subtitle =
| key = 
| details = Voice
| scoring = 
| catalogue =  
| year = 
| genre = Song
| description = Voice, piano (guitar)
| text = 
| reference = Second of the Two Songs from 'Twelfth Night}}

|}

Works without catalogue
 [Scherzo] in B minor, for string quartet (1885); completed by Kalevi Aho
 [Four Themes], for string quartet, in: G minor; E-flat major; A minor; and, E minor (1887)
 [33 Small Pieces], for string quartet (1888–89)
 [Allegro] in G minor, for string quartet (1888–89)
 Allegretto in B-flat major, for string quartet (1889)
 [Menuetto] in D minor, for piano trio (1882–85)
 [Andante]—Adagio—Allegro maestoso, for piano trio (1883–85)
 [Allegro] in C major, for piano trio (1885)
 [Moderato] in A minor, for piano trio (1885)
 Ljunga Wirginia, for violin, cello, and piano four hands (1885); sixth movement completed by Kalevi Aho
 [Andantino] in A major, for piano trio (1886) 
 [Allegretto] in A-flat major, for piano trio (1887–88)
 [Allegro] in D minor, for piano trio (1889); completed by Kalevi Aho
 [Allegretto] in E-flat major, for piano trio (1891–92); completed by Jaakko Kuusisto
 Sonata [movement] in D major, for violin and piano (1885)
 [Menuetto] in D minor, for violin and piano (1886)
 [Andante elegiaco] in F-sharp minor, for violin and piano (1887)
 [Maestoso] in C minor, for violin and piano (1887–88)
 [Tempo di Valse] in A major, for violin and piano (1888)
 Andante molto in B minor, for cello and piano (1888–89)
 [Adagio] in D minor, for violin and piano (1890)
 [Larghetto] in D minor, fragment for violin and piano (1890–92)
 Minuet in F major, for violin and cello (1891); completed by Jaakko Kuusisto
 [Grave] in D minor, fragment for violin and piano (1891–94)

To add to tablePiano Piano Suite (Florestan), JS 82 (1889)
 Sonata in F major, Op. 12 (1893)
 10 Pieces, Op. 24 (1894–1903)
 10 Bagatelles, Op. 34 (1914–16)
 10 Pensées lyriques, Op. 40 (1912–14)
 10 Pieces, Op. 58 (1909)
 Three Sonatinas, Op. 67 (1912)
 No. 1 in F-sharp minor
 No. 2 in E major
 No. 3 in B-flat minor
 2 Rondinos, Op. 68 (1912)
 4 Lyric Pieces, Op. 74 (1914)
 5 Pieces (The Trees), Op. 75 (1914)
 13 Pieces, Op. 76 (1914)
 5 Pieces (The Flowers), Op. 85 (1916)
 6 Pieces, Op. 94 (1919)
 6 Bagatelles, Op. 97 (1920)
 8 Short Pieces, Op. 99 (1922)
 5 Romantic Compositions, Op. 101 (1923)
 5 Characteristic Impressions, Op. 103 (1924)
 5 Esquisses, Op. 114 (1929)Organ' Preludium (1925)
 Postludium (1925)
 Intrada, Op. 111a (1925)
 Surusoitto (Funeral Music), Op. 111b (1931)
 Opening Hymn (from Masonic Ritual Music, Op. 113 (1926/1948))
 Marche funèbre (Funeral March) from Masonic Ritual Music'', Op. 113 (1926/1948))

Notes

References

External links
 Yhtenäistetty Jean Sibelius: Teosten yhtenäistettyjen nimekkeiden ohjeluettelo. 2013. [A complete list of works in Finnish and English.] 

 
Sibelius, Jean